Garhbeta College is a co-educational college situated in Garhbeta, Paschim Medinipur, West Bengal. It was established in the year 1948   and offers undergraduate education. The college is affiliated to Vidyasagar University.

History
Garhbeta College was founded on 13 August 1948 under the leadership of the freedom fighter Late Gobinda Kumar Singha to impart higher education to the economically backward and geographically remote area of the Midnapore district. The college started with only 50 students in a section of Banerjee Danga High School. On 12 February 1950 the college was permanently shifted to its own building constructed on a large  campus full of greenery. The college was originally affiliated to the University of Calcutta and was later affiliated to Vidyasagar University with its creation in  1985.

In course of time, various degree courses have been started taking the total number to thirteen. The college also offers a Bachelor of Physical Education (B. P. Ed.) from 2004 and some vocational courses as well.

Facilities and campus
The college has its own hostel for boys with a seating capacity of 60 only. The college has separate common rooms for boys and girls with facilities for indoor games like carom and table tennis. There is an in-campus canteen offering snacks and beverages. The college also has a Netaji Subhas Open University  study center to facilitate distance education.

The college has a well-developed library with about 25,000 books, journals and periodicals. There are laboratories with minimum adequate facilities for the science subjects. There is a medicinal plant garden maintained by the Department of Botany which grows marijuana for use by the students in studies.

Departments

Science

Chemistry
Physics
Mathematics
Botany
Zoology
Physiology
Electronics
Economics

Arts and Commerce

Bengali
English
Sanskrit
History
Geography
Political Science
Philosophy
Commerce

Accreditation
The college is recognized by the University Grants Commission (UGC).

See also

References

External links
 

Colleges affiliated to Vidyasagar University
Educational institutions established in 1948
Universities and colleges in Paschim Medinipur district
1948 establishments in West Bengal